Bastianich is a Croatian-italianised surname that may refer to the following people:
Joe Bastianich (born 1968), American restaurateur, winemaker, author, and television personality
Lidia Bastianich (born 1947), American celebrity chef and television host, mother of Joe and Tanya
Tanya Bastianich Manuali (born 1972), American restaurateur, daughter of Lidia, sister of Joe